Arrigo Petacco (7 August 1929 – 3 April 2018) was an Italian writer, historian and journalist.

Life and activities 
Petacco was special envoy, editor-in-chief and executive director of La Nazione and La Storia Illustrata, and author of the homonymous monthly television program on the RAI.

He began his journalistic career at Il Lavoro, a newspaper published in Genoa, directed by Sandro Pertini. Prolific historical writer, experienced journalist, he wrote several film plots and made numerous television programs, especially for RAI, the Italian main public service broadcaster. In his career as a journalist has interviewed some of the protagonists of the Second World War.

In 1957, Petacco married Lucetta De Martino with whom he had two daughters: Monica, who lives in Rome, and Carlotta, living in Milan. He is widowed since 1989.
Since then he lives alone in Portovenere, near La Spezia.

In 1983, he won the Saint Vincent award for journalism and in 2006 received the Capo d'Orlando prize for journalism. Petacco died on 3 April 2018 of liver cancer at the age of 88.

Works

"A tragedy revealed" 
Petacco's masterwork is the historical essay L'esodo: la tragedia negata d'Istria, Dalmazia e Venezia Giulia 1942–1956 published in 1999 and later translated in several languages. The English edition was published in 2005 under the title A tragedy revealed: the story of the Italian population of Istria, Dalmatia, and Venezia Giulia, 1942–1956, and had immediately a great success. Exposing in the book one of the great atrocities of our time, Petacco gives voice in a very touching way to the suffering of a people who were rejected and denied by their own country. Those who survived are validated by the historical and personal accounts presented in the book.

Publications
 La morte cammina con la sposa. (Collezione: I romanzi della notte). Rome, Boselli, 1958.
 L'anarchico che venne dall'America. Storia di Gaetano Bresci e del complotto per uccidere Umberto I. Milan, Mondadori, 1969.
 La seconda guerra mondiale. 9 volumi. Rome, Armando Curcio Editor, 1979.
 Joe Petrosino. Milan, Mondadori, 1972.
 Dal Gran Consiglio al Gran Sasso: una storia da rifare. Milan, Rizzoli, 1973 (coautore Sergio Zavoli).
 Il prefetto di ferro. L'uomo di Mussolini che mise in ginocchio la mafia. Milan, Mondadori, 1975.
 Le battaglie navali del Mediterraneo nella Seconda guerra mondiale Milan, Mondadori, 1976.
 Riservato per il Duce. Milan, Mondadori 1979.
 Storia del Fascismo. 6 volumi. Rome, Armando Curcio Editore, 1981.
 Pavolini: l'ultima raffica di Salò. Milan, Mondadori, 1982.
 I grandi enigmi della storia. (6 voll.) Novara, DeAgostini, 1984.
 Come eravamo negli anni di guerra? (1940–1945). Novara, DeAgostini, 1984.
 Dear Benito, Caro Winston. Milan, Mondadori, 1985.
 I ragazzi del '44. Milan, Mondadori, 1987.
 Storia bugiarda. Bari, Laterza, 1989.
 W Gesu W Maria W l'Italia – Ugo Bassi, il cappellano di Garibaldi. Rome, Nuove edizioni del gallo, 1990.
 1940: giorno per giorno attraverso i bollettini del Comando supremo. Milano, Leonardo, 1990. .
 1941: giorno per giorno attraverso i bollettini del Comando supremo. Milano, Leonardo, 1990. .
 1942: giorno per giorno attraverso i bollettini del Comando supremo. Milano, Leonardo, 1991. .
 1943: giorno per giorno attraverso i bollettini del Comando supremo. Milan, Leonardo, 1993. 
 La regina del Sud. Milano, Mondadori, 1992.
 La principessa del nord. La misteriosa vita della dama del Risorgimento: Cristina di Belgioioso. Milano, Mondadori, 1993.
 La signora della Vandea. Un'italiana alla conquista del trono di Francia. Milan, Modadori, 1994.
 Le battaglie navali del Mediterraneo nella seconda guerra mondiale. Milan, Mondadori, 1995.
 La nostra guerra 1940–1945. L'avventura bellica tra bugie e verità. Milan, Mondadori, 1995.
 Il comunista in camicia nera: Nicola Bombacci, tra Lenin e Mussolini. Milan, Mondadori, 1996.
 Regina. La vita e i segreti di Maria José. Milan, Mondadori, 1997.
 L'archivio segreto di Mussolini. Milan, Mondadori, 1997
 L'armata scomparsa: l'avventura degli italiani in Russia. Milan, Mondadori, 1998.
 Il superfascista. Vita e morte di Alessandro Pavolini. Milan, Mondadori, 1998.
 L'esodo: la tragedia negata degli italiani d'Istria, Dalmazia e Venezia Giulia. Milano, Mondadori, 1999.
 L'anarchico che venne dall'America. (nuova edizione), Milano, Mondadori, 2000.
 L'Amante dell'imperatore. Milano, Mondadori, 2000
 Joe Petrosino. Milano, Mondadori, 2001.
 Ammazzate quel fascista! Vita intrepida di Ettore Muti. Milan, Mondadori, 2002.
 Faccetta nera: storia della conquista dell'impero. Milan, Mondadori, 2003.
 Il Cristo dell'Amiata. Milan, Mondadori, 2003.
 L'uomo della provvidenza. Milan, Mondadori, 2004.
 La croce e la mezzaluna: Lepanto 7 ottobre 1571. Milan, Mondadori, 2005.
 Viva la muerte!: mito e realta della guerra civile spagnola, 1936–39. Milan, Mondadori, 2006.
 L'ultima crociata: quando gli ottomani arrivarono alle porte dell'Europa. Milan, Mondadori, 2007.
 La scelta: l'invenzione della Repubblica Italiana. Roma, Armando Curcio, 2008.
 La strana guerra, 1939–1940: quando Hitler e Stalin erano alleati e Mussolini stava a guardare. Milan, Mondadori,2008.
 Il regno del Nord, 1859: il sogno di Cavour infranto da Garibaldi. Milano, Mondadori, 2009.
 La Resistenza tricolore. Milano, Mondadori, 2010 (co-author Giancarlo Mazzuca).

Films
 La battaglia d'Inghilterra
 L'assedio di Malta
 La fine del dirigibile
 La battaglia del Rio de la Plata (Graf Spee)
 Lo sbarco in Normandia
 Lo sbarco di Salerno
 La battaglia dell'Atlantico
 La battaglia di Mosca
 La vera storia di Rommel
 La vera storia di Eddie Chapman
 La fine del Thresher
 La spia di Pearl Harbor
 La battaglia del Piave
 Vittorio Veneto
 L'impresa di Premuda
 L'ultima trincea
 Ustascia
 Dal Gran Consiglio al Gran Sasso (in collaboration with Sergio Zavoli)
 I due Yemen
 I figli di Lawrence
 1943, l'anno della svolta

Notes

See also 
Istrian-Dalmatian exodus
Sandro Pertini
Premio Saint-Vincent per il giornalismo

1929 births
2018 deaths
People from the Province of La Spezia
20th-century Italian historians
Italian journalists
Italian male journalists
Italian male writers
Historians of World War II
Deaths from liver cancer
21st-century Italian historians